Adam Klasfeld is a journalist and playwright. He has written and directed several theater plays and is a journalist for the Courthouse News and also a regular reporter for a variety of news outlets.

Education 
He studied theatre at Rutgers University and followed up on his studies at the Academy of Theatre in London under Richard Digby Day.

Theater career 
His acting career began early at the Rutgers Cabaret, and since he has performed on several stages in the United States and Europe. He is often involved with the theater company called One Armed Man. In July 2009, his play The Report of My Death was performed on board a ship on the Hudson River, New York. He also organized a theater festival at the Brecht Forum.

Journalistic career 
As a journalist he has reported about the trial of the Iranian businessman Reza Zarrab, who circumvented the US sanction regime on Iran and also in a similar case in which Halkbank, a Turkish state owned bank, is also accused of circumventing the US sanctions against Iran.  The access to an article he wrote about a money courier of Reza Zarrab, was banned by a court in Istanbul on the 23 September 2020. Other relevant events he covered in his articles were the attempted impeachment of U.S. President Donald Trump and the trial of Michael Cohen, a former lawyer to Donald Trump. He was accused by the Turkish newspaper Daily Sabah of being a complicit of the so-called terrorist organization FETÖ, the movement of Fethullah Gülen.

Plays 
 I Dreamed I Saw Joe Hill's Lover, Last Night 
 The Prostitute of Reverie Valley
 Good Fences Make Good Neighbors

References 

American theatre directors
Year of birth missing (living people)
Living people